The 2013 Top End Under-19 Series is an Under-19 One Day International cricket tournament in the Australia that was held between India, New Zealand and Australia. It was held between Jun 30, 2013 and Jul 12, 2013. India Under-19 won the 2013 Top End Under-19 Series  against Australia Under-19 by eight wickets in the final.

Venues
All matches of the Tournament were held at the Marrara Cricket Ground, Darwin.

Squads

Fixtures

Group stage

Points table

Points table

Round 1

New Zealand won the toss and elected to field.
RR Ayre, TAM Leaver and J Maher (AUS) GD Tryon  (NZL) made their Youth ODI debuts.

Australia won the toss and elected to field.
G Bell and M Kelly (AUS) Atul Singh, AK Bains, DJ Hooda, SS Iyer, SN Khan, AR Lamba and CV Milind  (IND) made their Youth ODI debuts.

New Zealand won the toss and elected to field.
Mohammad Saif (IND)  AT Hodgson (NZL) made their Youth ODI debuts.

Round 2

New Zealand won the toss and elected to bat.

India won the toss and elected to field.
J Dunning (AUS) RT Arothe, RK Bhui and AA Gani (IND) made their Youth ODI debuts.

New Zealand won the toss and elected to bat.

Final

India won the toss and elected to bat.

Statistics

Batting
Most runs

Bowling
Most wickets

See also

References

International cricket competitions in 2013
2013 in Australian cricket
2013 in New Zealand cricket
2013 in Indian cricket
Sport in Darwin, Northern Territory
Cricket in the Northern Territory
International cricket competitions in Australia
Under-19 cricket
2010s in the Northern Territory